The Scotland national rugby sevens team competes in the World Rugby Sevens Series, Rugby World Cup Sevens and the Commonwealth Games. The head coach is Ciaran Beattie, supported by manager Sean Lamont and skills coach Graham Shiel.

During 2006, the side were in danger of no longer competing in the Sevens World Series due to the financial problems faced by the Scottish Rugby Union. However, they gained a reprieve when the International Rugby Board announced that a leg of the Sevens World Series would be held at Murrayfield in Edinburgh, starting in 2007. The SRU then announced that the Scotland sevens team would compete in all eight legs of the Sevens World Series, and draw players from the country's national academy. Scotland were champions of the 2016 London Sevens.

Team

Current squad

World Rugby Sevens Series 

Scotland has competed in the World Rugby Sevens Series every season since the Series’ inception in 1999–2000. Scotland’s best finish is seventh place in 2016–17.

Tournament results

Rugby World Cup Sevens

Commonwealth Games

Players

Player records
 the career statistics leaders in the World Rugby Sevens Series are shown in the following tale. Players in bold are still active.

Former squads

The 10-round Sevens World Series XVIII.

The 10-round Sevens World Series XVII.

Honours
 Kelso Sevens
 Champions (1): 1996
 Selkirk Sevens
 Champions (1): 1996

See also
 Edinburgh Sevens
 Scotland national rugby union team
 Scottish Rugby Union
 Flower of Scotland - the de facto Scottish National Anthem, sung before all Scottish international matches

References

External links
 

National rugby sevens teams
Sevens